is a Japanese sprint canoeist born in Yamanashi prefecture. He won a bronze medal, along with his partner Keiji Mizumoto, in the men's kayak doubles (1000 m) at the 2010 Asian Games in Guangzhou, China.

Watanabe qualified for the men's K-2 200 metres at the 2012 Summer Olympics in London by placing first at the 2011 Asian Canoe Sprint Championships in Tehran, Iran. Watanabe and his partner Momotaro Matsushita paddled to a second-place finish, and tenth overall in the B-final by twenty-four hundredths of a second (0.24) behind the Kazakh pair Alexey Dergunov and Yevgeniy Alexeyev, posting their time of 35.739 seconds.

References

External links
NBC Olympics Profile

1988 births
Japanese male canoeists
Living people
Olympic canoeists of Japan
Canoeists at the 2012 Summer Olympics
Asian Games medalists in canoeing
Canoeists at the 2010 Asian Games
Asian Games bronze medalists for Japan
Medalists at the 2010 Asian Games
People from Yamanashi Prefecture